This is a list of units of the British Army's Royal Corps of Signals.

Brigades

1st Signal Brigade (1982—1987)
1st Signal Group (1968—1982)
1st (United Kingdom) Signal Brigade (1995—Present)
2nd (National Communications) Signal Brigade (1982—2012)
2nd (Static Communications) Signal Group (1968—1982)
2nd Signal Brigade (1982—1992)
11th Signal Brigade and Headquarters West Midlands (2014—Present)
11th Signal Brigade (V) (1967—1992)
11th (Allied Rapid Reaction Corps) Signal Brigade (1992—1997)
11th Signal Brigade (1997—2014)
12th Signal Brigade (1982—1992)

Groups

 1st Signal Group (1968—1982), later 1st (United Kingdom) Signal Brigade
 2nd (Static Communications) Signal Group (1968—1982), later 2nd (National Communications) Signal Brigade
 3rd Signal Group (V) (1967—1975)
 4th Signal Group (1969—1992)
 12th Signal Group (1967—1982), later 12th Signal Brigade
 13th Signal Group (V) (1967—1972)
 Headquarters, Radio Group British Army of the Rhine (1963—1977)
 Headquarters, Communications and Security Group (United Kingdom)
 Headquarters, Royal Signals Malta
 Headquarters, Commonwealth Communications Networtk

Regiments

Air Formation

Line of Communications
 2 LoC

HQ and Signal

Signal

Squadrons

See also
 List of Royal Air Force Radio & Signals units

References

Citations

Bibliography